Júlio Martins may refer to:
Júlio César Oliveira Martins, (born 1983) Brazilian football midfielder
Júlio César Martins, (born 1978) Brazilian football goalkeeper

See also
Julio Martínez (disambiguation), Spanish equivalent